Albert Charles Bartlett was an electrical engineer working for the General Electric Company in Wembley.  He had some correspondence with Wilhelm Cauer on the subject of filter designs.

He published a treatment of geometrically symmetrical 2-port networks in 1927 and is responsible for Bartlett's bisection theorem which shows that any symmetrical network can be transformed into a symmetrical lattice network.

He also patented the idea of using the method of an active amplifier with "negative resistance" to cancel the inductance of a telephone line.

Publications

Journal articles

Bartlett, AC, "An extension of a property of artificial lines", Phil. Mag., vol 4, p902, November 1927.
Bartlett, AC, "A standard of small capacity differences", J. Sci. Instrum., vol 8, No 8 (August 1931), pp260–262.
Bartlett, AC, "Note on the theory of screened impedances in A.C. bridges with the Wagner earth",J. Sci. Instrum., vol 6, No 9 (September 1929), pp277–280.
Bartlett, AC, "A small peak voltmeter and an application", J. Sci. Instrum., vol 8, No 9 (June 1924), pp281–284.

Patents

Bartlett, AC, Line balance for loaded telephone circuits, GB1767199, filed 30 Mar 1925, issued 24 Jun 1930.
Bartlett, AC, Improvements in Electric Discharge Tubes, GB239736, filed 30 Oct 1924, issued 17 Sept 1925.
Bartlett, AC, An improved method for reducing the self-inductance of electric circuits, GB278036, filed 25 May 1926, issued 26 Sep 1927.

Books
Bartlett, AC, The theory of electrical artificial lines and filters, 1930, Chapman & Hall (London), LCCN 30030668.

References

British electrical engineers
British electronics engineers
Year of birth missing
Year of death missing
Place of birth missing
Place of death missing